The CWA Heavyweight Championship was a major professional wrestling title defended in the Championship Wrestling Association. It was created through the unification of the NWA Mid-America Heavyweight, AWA Southern Heavyweight and CWA/AWA International Heavyweight championships.

The title was thus considered the most important title in the promotion until Jerry Lawler won the AWA World Heavyweight Championship on May 5, 1988. On December 13, 1988, Lawler defeated Kerry Von Erich to win the World Class Heavyweight Championship and effectively rename the latter title the USWA Unified World Heavyweight Championship and make it the new top championship in Memphis. The CWA title continued as the secondary title until late 1989 when it was replaced with the USWA Southern Heavyweight Championship.

Title history

Footnotes

References

1988 Mid-South Coliseum results – ProWrestlingHistory.com
1989 Mid-South Coliseum results – ProWrestlingHistory.com

See also
Continental Wrestling Association
United States Wrestling Association

Continental Wrestling Association championships
Heavyweight wrestling championships